Gregg Deal (Pyramid Lake Paiute) is an artist and activist whose work deals with "Indigenous identity and pop culture, touching on issues of race relations, historical consideration and stereotype"

Biography 
Gregg Deal was born in Park City, Utah, to a white father and Native American mother. Deal is an enrolled as a member of the Pyramid Lake Paiute Tribe.

Deal met his wife, Megan Prymak in Provo, Utah in 1998. The following year, they moved to Montclair, Virginia and married. Deal enrolled as a student at George Mason University in 1999, studying art with a concentration in painting. He and his family lived in the Washington, D.C., area for 17 years before moving to their current place of residence, Colorado Springs, CO. He resides there with his wife and five children.

Career and artwork   
Deal lived and worked as a graphic designer then self-employed artist in the Washington, D.C., area for 16 years. After moving to Denver, CO, the Denver Art Museum hosted Deal as a Native Arts Artist-in-Residence. Currently, Deal is an Artist-in-Residence at UC Berkeley for the 2017–2018 school year.

Solo exhibitions 

 Existence as Protest, 2017 (Redline Gallery, Milwaukee, WI) 
 Supreme Law of the Land, 2017 (Denver Art Museum, Denver, CO)
 There is No Plan B, 2016 (The Fridge, Washington, D.C.) 
 White Indian, 2016 (Denver Art Museum, Denver, CO)
 This Is Indian Land, 2015 (Art Mart, Fredericksburg, VA)
 Pan-Indian Romantic Comedy, 2015 (Wooly Mammoth, Washington, D.C.)
 REDSKIN, 2014 (Art All Night: Nuit Blanche, Washington, D.C.) 
 Romantic Nationalism, 2014 (The Dunes, Washington, D.C.) 
 Art Crimes, 2013 (The Dunes, Washington, D.C.) 
 From The Street To The Studio: The Work of Gregg Deal, 2012 (Capital One, McLean, VA) 
 Faces in The Crowd, 2012 (Foundation Gallery & Liveroom, Kensington, MD)
 Popmatic, 2010 (Sukio, Washington, D.C.)
 People, 2004 (Common Ground, Washington, D.C.)

Activism 

Deal’s activism exists in his art, as well as his participation in political movements. He has been heavily involved with the #changethename movement, which addresses the Native American mascot controversy and has appeared on an episode of Totally Biased with Kamau Bell as well as The Daily Show with John Stewart. He created a #changethename video on Vimeo to invite Indigenous people to weigh in on the mascot issue in response to what he perceived as mainstream media’s failure to include Indigenous voices within the discussion.

Inspiration / Influences- 
Gregg Deal cites James Luna, a Payómkawichum(Luiseño) as one of his main influences. After winning a mentorship with the Ford Foundation, Deal accompanied Luna to the Venice Biennale, where he assisted Luna for his performance piece "Emendatio" for two weeks. Afterwards, Deal developed the concept of The Last American Indian on Earth.

Deal draws inspiration from various street artists; he cites Washington local artists 181HKS, Ultra, Con and Maz Paz in an interview with Aljazeera, as well as national artists GIANT, REVOK, TWIST and Shepard Fairey. Deal also mentions several Indigenous artists that inspire him: Jaque Fraqua, Ernesto Yerena, Nani Chacon, Cheyenne Randall and Jared Yazzie.

See also 
List of Native American artists
Visual arts by indigenous peoples of the Americas
List of Washington Redskins name change advocates

References

1975 births
Living people
Native American painters
Native American male artists
George Mason University alumni
Native American performance artists
People from Park City, Utah
Native American people from Utah
Northern Paiute people